Matias Aguayo (born 1973 in Santiago, Chile) is a Chilean-German techno producer and DJ. 

Aguayo grew up in Gummersbach, Germany. In 1997, working with Michael Mayer under the project name Zimt, he released his first singe "U.O.A.A." on the label Ladomat 2000. Shortly afterwards he founded the project Closer Musik with Dirk Leyers. In 2004, the group disbanded and Aguayo launched his solo career with the album Are You Really Lost?.

In 2006, Aguayo was one of four organizers of the Bumbumbox parties, which took place unannounced in the public space of various major cities in South America. The party organizers then founded the techno label Cómeme, which focuses on releasing music by South American producers.

Albums
Are You Really Lost? (Kompakt, 2005)
Ay Ay Ay (Kompakt, 2009)
I Don't Smoke (Kompakt, 2011)
The Visitor (Cómeme, 2013)
Support Alien Invasion (Cómeme, Crammed Discs, 2019)

References

Living people
1973 births
Electronic dance music DJs
People from Gummersbach
Musicians from Santiago